The Silver Condor Award for Best Supporting Actress , given by the Argentine Film Critics Association, awards the best supporting actress in Argentina each year:

References

 
Argentine Film Critics Association